Strada statale 4 Via Salaria is an Italian state highway, linking Rome to the Adriatic sea passing through Rieti and Ascoli Piceno. Its route retraces that of the ancient Via Salaria Roman road. It is a single carriageway highway for most of its route.

Route

Rome to Rieti 

Strada statale 4 Via Salaria starts Northeast of Rome, just outside the Aurelian Walls, where until 1921 Porta Salaria was located to control access to the city. The initial stretch of SS 4 is more similar to an urban road than to a highway, as the area has now become densely populated and buildings have been raised by the roadside. After four kilometres SS4 meets Tangenziale Est di Roma and, from that point on, becomes a busy dual carriageway urban road, filled by people leaving or entering the city.

In the Castel Giubileo neighborhood, SS4 exits the city of Rome and meets Grande Raccordo Anulare (GRA), where most of the traffic flows. Immediately after, the road returns a single carriageway highway; in fact the subsequent 20 kilometer stretch, from the GRA to Passo Corese, has seen his importance reduced since the 6-lane Autostrada A1 runs parallel to it and absorbs most of the long-distance traffic. Nevertheless, SS4 remains important to many mid-sized towns in Rome's hinterland, such as Settebagni, Monterotondo and Mentana.

Passo Corese marks both the point where SS4 enters the Province of Rieti and the point where it diverges from Autostrada A1, receiving from it all traffic to the Adriatic. The road here leaves the Tiber valley and ventures into the more hilly Sabina region, commencing its long, gradual ascent to the Apennines. For this reason, SS4 had once a rather rough course from here on, with tight bends and continuous rises and descents; current SS4 is a completely new road (constructed in the 1960s to replace the old one from Passo Corese to Rieti), much more straight and wide, albeit still with a single carriageway.

As the road passes the Sabine mountains, it reaches an altitude of 400 metres above sea level at Osteria Nuova and it descents into a narrow valley, then rises again until reaching 570 metres in the village of Ornaro, and finally descents.

 south of province capital Rieti the road becomes a dual carriageway road; the long "Colle Giardino" road tunnel allows the road to leave Sabine mountains behind and to enter the Rieti plain (400 metres on sea level) where the city is settled.

Rieti to the Adriatic 

In Rieti SS4 turns sharply into East, quickly leaves the Rieti plain and prosecutes in the Velino valley. Shortly before Cittaducale, the road returns a single carriageway and pretty narrow road, which still needs to be uprated and follows a similar path to the ancient Roman road. While slightly ascending, SS4 reaches the spa town of Cotilia and then Antrodoco, where it joins State Highway 17 to L'Aquila.

In Antrodoco (470 metres on sea level) the road follows the river's valley, bending to the north and entering the narrow "Gole del Velino" canyon. Here SS4 becomes similar to a mountain road, since bends become more tight and the ascent more steep; but halfway through the canyon, a recently uprated stretch of the road begins, where tunnels and viaducts make the road smoother albeit still with a single carriageway.

In Posta, at 700 metres above sea level, SS4 leaves the canyon and keeps going up in a broader plateau. Shortly after Cittareale the highway reaches its upper point, the Torrita Pass, at around 1010 metres on the sea level.

From here on the roads descents following the course of the narrow Tronto valley. Soon after Amatrice and Accumoli, the road leaves Lazio and enters the region of Marche. Passing through Arquata del Tronto (780 metres on sea level) and Acquasanta Terme (390 metres), SS4 keeps descending until it reaches province capital Ascoli Piceno (150 metres on sea level).

After Ascoli the road continues towards the Adriatic sea with a rather winding path, where it ends in a junction with SS 16 Adriatica and the Autostrada A14 in Porto d'Ascoli (near San Benedetto del Tronto). Still, such trait has been recently declassed to provincial road, since it has been replaced by Raccordo autostradale 11, a more modern dual carriageway road.

Future interventions 
Today SS4 is a busy road between Rieti and Passo Corese, as it is the main road link between Rieti and Rome; motorists use it to reach the Autostrada A1 in Passo Corese and continue towards Rome in the more modern road. In this trait SS4 has a single, albeit reasonably wide carriageway, which was constructed in the 1960s in place of an earlier, less smooth road. For this reason, Italian Government plans to make SS4 a dual carriageway road between Rieti and Passo Corese, but around 1.5 billion euros are needed and it is not known when funds will be granted.

Uprating of the trait from Cittaducale to Posta, where the carriageway is rather narrow and the road climbs up the Apennine mountains, is also planned to make the carriageway wider and less winding - even if the road will remain with a single carriageway. The first part of these road works started in 2005 on the Posta-Micigliano stretch and are currently underway.

References 

004